Richard Cecil Churchman (born March 14, 1958) is a former American football defensive back who played two seasons with the San Francisco 49ers of the National Football League (NFL). He was drafted by the 49ers in the fourth round of the 1980 NFL Draft. He played college football at the University of Texas at Austin and attended Pearland High School in Pearland, Texas. He was a member of the San Francisco 49ers team that won Super Bowl XVI.

References

External links
Just Sports Stats
College Stats
Fanbase profile

Living people
1958 births
Players of American football from Texas
American football defensive backs
Texas Longhorns football players
San Francisco 49ers players
People from Pearland, Texas
Sportspeople from Harris County, Texas
Pearland High School alumni